Lazi, officially the Municipality of Lazi, is a 4th class municipality in the province of Siquijor, Philippines. According to the 2020 census, it has a population of 22,488 people.

Lazi Church is currently in the tentative list for UNESCO World Heritage Sites under the Baroque Churches of the Philippines (Extension). A proposal has been suggested by scholars to make a separate UNESCO inclusion for "Old Centre of Lazi which includes the Lazi Church".

Geography

Barangays
Lazi comprises 18 barangays:

Climate

Demographics

Economy

Gallery

References

External links

 Lazi Profile at PhilAtlas.com
 [ Philippine Standard Geographic Code]

Municipalities of Siquijor